Elizabeth Ross (born 6 October 1996) is a New Zealand representative rower. She won a gold medal as a member of the women's eight team at the 2019 World Rowing Championships.

References

External links

Living people
1996 births
New Zealand female rowers
World Rowing Championships medalists for New Zealand
Rowers at the 2020 Summer Olympics
Medalists at the 2020 Summer Olympics
Olympic medalists in rowing
Olympic silver medalists for New Zealand
Olympic rowers of New Zealand
21st-century New Zealand women